The 1952 United States presidential election in South Carolina took place on November 4, 1952, as part of the 1952 United States presidential election. South Carolina voters chose 8 representatives, or electors, to the Electoral College, who voted for president and vice president.

Background
For six decades up to 1950, South Carolina had been a one-party state dominated by the Democratic Party. The Republican Party had been moribund due to the disfranchisement of blacks and the complete absence of other support bases as the Palmetto State completely lacked upland or German refugee whites opposed to secession. Between 1900 and 1948, no Republican presidential candidate ever obtained more than seven percent of the total presidential vote – a vote which in 1924 reached as low as 6.6% of the total voting-age population.

This absolute loyalty began to break down during World War II when Vice-Presidents Henry A. Wallace and Harry Truman began to realize that a legacy of discrimination against blacks was a threat to the United States' image abroad and its ability to win the Cold War against the radically egalitarian rhetoric of Communism. In the 1948 presidential election, Truman was backed by only 24% of South Carolina's limited electorate – most of that from the relatively few upcountry poor whites able to meet rigorous voting requirements – and state Governor Strom Thurmond won 71%, carrying every county except Anderson and Spartanburg.

Sweeping changes in electorate
Between the 1948 and 1952 presidential elections, South Carolina's electorate saw the most radical changes in any state since Reconstruction and "Redemption" had expanded and then contracted the electorates of all former Confederate states. The state became the last to fully adopt the secret ballot, whose absence had allowed intimidation of those who refused to vote Democratic in general elections, and it also fully abolished the poll tax that had further restricted white turnout in presidential elections. There was also some expansion of black voter registration, though as in all areas of the South east of the Mississippi River this was largely an urban phenomenon.

Continuing sentiment against national Democrats
Despite Truman announcing as early as May 1950 that he would not run again for President in 1952, it had already become clear that South Carolina's rulers remained severely disenchanted with the national Democratic Party. Originally it was planned that Eisenhower would run on an independent ticket with former state Governor James F. Byrnes, who regained his Senate seat in the 1950 primary, with the ultimate goal of the entire South controlling national politics as an unpledged electoral slate.

Despite some criticism of his policies, Byrnes created an organization named "Independents for Eisenhower" which was aimed at allowing white Southerners to leave the Democratic Party without embracing the still-feared "Party of Lincoln". These would join with a small number of remnant Republicans to form a fusion slate for Eisenhower – who by the time this plan was developed in September had already won the Republican nomination. In addition to Byrnes, Dixiecrat candidate Thurmond also endorsed Eisenhower, foreshadowing his switch to the Republican Party to support the much more conservative Barry Goldwater a dozen years later.

Further sentiment against the national Democratic Party resulted from fears that the Supreme Court would – as it did in the legendary Brown v. Board of Education case a year and a half after the election – rule South Carolina's de jure segregated school system a violation of the Fourteenth Amendment.

Vote
From the time Eisenhower announced he would run on an independent slate nominated by the many dissident Democrats, he gained substantial support, most especially in the small black-majority rural counties where only whites voted. However, polls always had Stevenson staying ahead of Eisenhower, and in the end he carried the state by a small majority of 5,000 votes. Stevenson's victory was largely due to his ability to maintain two- and three-to-one majorities in the poor white upcountry counties that had given substantial opposition to Thurmond, along with a substantial majority of the 20,000 or so blacks who are believed to have voted.

The Palmetto State was ultimately won by Stevenson and running mate Alabama Senator John Sparkman, with 50.72% of the popular vote, against Columbia University President Eisenhower (R–New York) and California Senator Richard Nixon, with 49.28% of the popular vote. , this is the last election in which Aiken County voted for a Democratic presidential candidate.

Results

Results by county

Notes

References

South Carolina
1952
1952 South Carolina elections